The 1964 Toledo Rockets football team was an American football team that represented Toledo University in the Mid-American Conference (MAC) during the 1964 NCAA University Division football season. In their second season under head coach Frank Lauterbur, the Rockets compiled a 2–8 record (1–5 against MAC opponents), finished in seventh place in the MAC, and were outscored by all opponents by a combined total of 218 to 127.

The team's statistical leaders included Dan Simrell with 1,239 passing yards, Jim Berkey with 408 rushing yards, and Henry Burch with 412 receiving yards.

Schedule

References

Toledo
Toledo Rockets football seasons
Toledo Rockets football